Ross Jordan Krautman is a former All-American football placekicker who played for the Syracuse Orange. Krautman is considered one of the best placekickers of his class. Krautman's NFL prospects were crushed due to a chronic hip injury.

Early life and high school career
Krautman was born in Englewood, New Jersey. He grew up in Franklin Lakes, New Jersey, where he attended Ramapo High School. As a four-year starter, he made 123-of-124 PATs, a New Jersey state record and highest extra point percentage in state history, in addition to holding the state record for most consecutive PATs in a career with 84. Krautman also made 34 field goals during his high school career. Krautman was a two-star prospect by Scout.com and its No. 20-rated kicker in the 2010 class. He also played in the 2010 All-America Bowl.  Krautman was rated the # 1 kicker in his class by Max Emfinger Recruiting and was also a CSA All-American.

College career
As a freshman in 2010, Krautman hit 18 total field goals, tying single-season school record. He also hit 16 consecutive field goals which again tied the single season school record. At the end of the season, Krautman was ranked 21st nationally and tied for second among Big East kickers with 1.38 field goals per game. His 95% field goal led the conference. Krautman tied three Syracuse records held by former NFL great Gary Anderson.

Krautman was named a Freshman All-American by the Football Writers Association of America, Sporting News and Rivals. Krautman was the leading point scorer for Syracuse during the 2010, 2011 and 2012 seasons.

Krautman was named to the Jewish Sports Review 2012 College Football All-America Team.

References

External links
Syracuse Orange bio
ESPN bio
CBS Sports bio

Living people
People from Englewood, New Jersey
People from Franklin Lakes, New Jersey
Players of American football from New Jersey
American football placekickers
Ramapo High School (New Jersey) alumni
Sportspeople from Bergen County, New Jersey
Syracuse Orange football players
1991 births
Jewish American sportspeople
21st-century American Jews